Southern Maori was one of New Zealand's four original parliamentary Māori electorates established in 1868, along with Eastern Maori, Western Maori and Eastern Maori. In 1996, with the introduction of MMP, the Maori electorates were updated, and Southern Maori was replaced with the Te Tai Tonga and Te Puku O Te Whenua electorates.

Population centres
From its initial definition of the Maori electorates in 1867 to the 1954 Maori electoral boundary redefinition, the Southern Maori electorate covered the entire South Island plus it included Stewart Island. The 1954 redefinition responded to the fact that the Southern Maori electorate had a much lower voter base than the three other Maori electorates, and this was responded to by adding the south-eastern part of the North Island to the Southern Maori electorate. Population centres that came to the electorate through this measure included Wellington, Masterton, Palmerston North, Napier, and Wairoa.

The next redistribution of Maori electoral boundaries was carried out in 1983, just after the responsibility for doing so had been transferred to the Representation Commission. The North Island boundaries of the Southern Maori electorate were adjusted, and Palmerston North transferred to the Western Maori electorate in that process.

Tribal areas
Ngāi Tahu and Ngati Kahungunu were the dominant tribes within the area covered by the electorate.

History
The Southern Maori electorate included the whole of the South Island to 1954, but its population was less than that of the other Māori electorates. In 1954 the boundaries were extended to include much of the East Coast of the North Island up to Napier and Wairoa in Hawkes Bay.

The first member of parliament for the new Māori electorate of Southern Maori from 1868 was John Patterson; he retired in 1870.

In 1932, Eruera Tirikatene won the electorate in a by-election and became the first Rātana MP; and then a Labour MP following the Labour-Ratana pact. When he died in 1967 his daughter Whetu Tirikatene-Sullivan took over the seat in a 1967 by-election.

In 1993 the National Party did not stand a candidate in the electorate as their proposed candidate did not apply in time.

In 1996 with mixed-member proportional (MMP) representation, the Te Tai Tonga electorate covering the South Island took over the major part of the Southern Maori electorate. Whetu Tirikatene-Sullivan who had held the Southern Maori electorate for many years narrowly lost the new seat to Tu Wyllie of New Zealand First and retired from politics.

Members of Parliament
The Southern Maori electorate was represented by ten Members of Parliament:

Key

Election results
Note that the affiliation of many early candidates is not known.

1993 election

1990 election

1987 election

1984 election

1981 election

1978 election

1975 election

1972 election

1969 election

1967 by-election

1966 election

1963 election

1960 election

1957 election

1954 election

1951 election

1949 election

1946 election

1932 by-election

1931 election

1922 by-election

1918 by-election

1899 election

1896 election

1893 election

1887 election

1885 by-election

1879 by-election

Notes

References

Historical Māori electorates
1996 disestablishments in New Zealand
1868 establishments in New Zealand